Léman may refer to:

Places
 Léman (department), a department of the First French Empire.
 Lake Geneva,  or 
 Canton of Léman, a canton of the Helvetic Republic

Schools
 Collège du Léman, a school in Versoix, Switzerland
 Léman Manhattan Preparatory School, a private school located in the financial district of New York City
 Léman International School - Chengdu, an international school in China

People
 Dominique Sébastien Léman, French botanist